Brenneria is a genus of Pectobacteriaceae, containing mostly pathogens of woody plants. This genus is named after the microbiologist Don J. Brenner.

Some members of this genus were formerly placed in Erwinia.

Species
Species now placed in Brenneria include:

 Brenneria alni
 Brenneria corticis
 Brenneria goodwinii
 Brenneria nigrifluens
 Brenneria populi
 Brenneria roseae
 subsp. americana
 subsp. roseae
 Brenneria rubrifaciens
 Brenneria salicis

Plant disease

Plant diseases and host 
Brenneria rubrifaciens (deep bark canker) - Walnut (Juglans regia)

Brenneria goodwinii  (Acute Oak Decline) - Oak (Quercus robur)

Brenneria salicis (Watermark disease) - Willow (Salix spp.)

Brenneria alni (bark canker) - Alder (Alnus spp.)

Brenneria nigrifluens (shallow bark canker) - Walnut (Juglans regia)

Brenneria populi (bark canker) - Poplar (Populus x euramericana)

Brenneria corticis (bark canker) - Poplar (Populus x euramericana)

Brenneria roseae subsp. roseae - possibly involved in Acute Oak Decline in the UK - Oak (Quercus cerris)

Brenneria roseae subsp. americana - possibly involved in Acute Oak Decline in the USA - Oak (Quercus kelloggii)

References

Bacteria genera